Mount Izaak Walton is a 12,077-foot-elevation (3,681 meter) mountain summit located in the Sierra Nevada mountain range in Fresno County of northern California, United States. It is situated in the John Muir Wilderness, on land managed by Sierra National Forest. Mount Izaak Walton ranks as the 404th-highest summit in California. The peak is set on Silver Divide, so precipitation runoff from the north side of this mountain drains into Fish Creek which is a tributary of the San Joaquin River, and from the south slope to Mono Creek, also a tributary of the San Joaquin.

History

This mountain's toponym was proposed in 1919 by Francis P. Farquhar and officially adopted in 1926 by the U.S. Board on Geographic Names to honor Izaak Walton (1593–1683), an English writer best known as the author of The Compleat Angler. The connection being that the mountain is set at the head of Fish Creek and Izaak Walton was an avid fisherman.

The first ascent of the summit was made July 5, 1971, by Andy Smatko, Bill Schuler, and Ed Treacy.

Climate
According to the Köppen climate classification system, Mount Izaak Walton is located in an alpine climate zone. Most weather fronts originate in the Pacific Ocean, and travel east toward the Sierra Nevada mountains. As fronts approach, they are forced upward by the peaks (orographic lift), causing them to drop their moisture in the form of rain or snowfall onto the range.

Gallery

See also

 Sierra Nevada

References

External links
 Weather forecast: Mount Izaak Walton
 Mount Izaak Walton (photo): Flickr

Sierra National Forest
Mountains of Fresno County, California
Mountains of the John Muir Wilderness
North American 3000 m summits
Mountains of Northern California
Sierra Nevada (United States)